Clanculus mixtus is a species of sea snail, a marine gastropod mollusk in the family Trochidae, the top snails.

Description
The size of the shell attains 12 mm.

Distribution
This marine species occurs in the Indian Ocean off Port Elizabeth (Eastern Cape) to Southern KwaZuluNatal, South Africa.

References

External links
 To Biodiversity Heritage Library (1 publication)
 To World Register of Marine Species
  K.H. Barnard, Contributions to the knowledge of South African marine Mollusca. Part IV. Gastropoda; Annals of the South African Museum. Annale van die Suid-Afrikaanse Museum v. 47 (1963-1974)

Endemic fauna of South Africa
mixtus
Gastropods described in 1903